Bidesh Ranjan Bose, also known as Bidesh Bose or Bidesh Basu (born on 15 November 1953), is a former Indian Bengali international footballer and politician from West Bengal. As a player, he appeared with Mohun Bagan AC in club football. He won the Uluberia Purba constituency seat in 2021 West Bengal assembly election as candidate of All India Trinamool Congress. He was awarded Banga Bhushan by the Government of West Bengal in 2014.

See also 

 Banga Bhushan 
 Uluberia Purba 
Football Lovers' Day

References 

Indian footballers
1953 births
Living people
India international footballers
Footballers from West Bengal
Mohun Bagan AC players
Footballers at the 1978 Asian Games
Footballers at the 1982 Asian Games
Asian Games competitors for India
Trinamool Congress politicians from West Bengal
West Bengal MLAs 2021–2026
Association football forwards